The Council elections held in Wolverhampton on Thursday 1 May 1986 were one third, and 20 of the 60 seats were up for election.

Due to a vacancy in Wednesfield North two members were elected.

The Labour Party gained the following wards from the Conservatives:

Bilston North, 
Fallings Park, 
Oxley, 
Wednesfield North (1 seat).

The SDP/Liberal Alliance gained Spring Vale from Labour.

Prior to the election the constitution of the council was:

Labour 34
Conservative 23
Alliance 2
Vacancy 1

Following the election the constitution of the council was:

Labour 38
Conservative 19
Alliance 3

Election result

1986
1986 English local elections
1980s in the West Midlands (county)